The following is a list of people executed by the U.S. state of Texas between 1940 and 1949. During this period 78 people were executed by electrocution at the Huntsville Unit in Texas.

Executions 1940–1949

See also
Capital punishment in Texas

References

External links
Death Row 1923-1973. Texas Department of Criminal Justice

1940
20th-century executions by Texas
1940s-related lists
1940s in Texas